Chica may refer to:

Chica (name), a given name, surname and nickname

Other uses
 Chica (dye), an orange-red dye
 Chicá, Panama, a subdistrict
 Fridericia chica, also called chica, a plant
 the title character of The Chica Show, an American animated television series
 Chica, an animatronic character from Five Nights at Freddy's

See also

 Boca Chica (disambiguation) 
Chika (disambiguation)
 Nhá Chica, "Aunt Francie" in Portuguese, nickname of Francisca de Paula de Jesus (1810–1895), first Afro-Brazilian Roman Catholic to be beatified
 Olga de Chica (1921–2016), Colombian neo-primitivist painter
Checa (disambiguation)
Chia (disambiguation)
Chiba (disambiguation)
Chic (disambiguation)
Chick (disambiguation)
Chico (disambiguation)
Chilca (disambiguation)
China (disambiguation)
Chita (disambiguation)

External links